Arthur is an unincorporated community and ghost town in Nevada, United States.

History
About fifty inhabitants lived in the Pole Canyon in 1881. Two related stories explain the origin of the name of the town. The first is that the post office was named for Chester Arthur, president of United States at the time and the second explain that the town was named after the first postmaster, Arthur Gedne.

The post office at Arthur was in operation from April 1881 until May 1887 and then from September 1889 until June 1951.

Ranching was always the main economic activity in Arthur. Most of the ranches remained in the same family for generations. A number of ranches continue to operate in and around Arthur. Many 19th-century buildings are still in use.

Notes

Unincorporated communities in Elko County, Nevada
Unincorporated communities in Nevada
Ghost towns in Elko County, Nevada
Elko, Nevada micropolitan area
Populated places established in 1881
Ghost towns in Nevada
1881 establishments in Nevada